Luigi San Nicolás Schellens (born 28 June 1992) is an Andorran international footballer who plays for Atlètic d'Escaldes as a striker

Career
Born in Escaldes-Engordany, San Nicolás has played club football for FC Andorra, CE Principat, FC Santa Coloma, FC Ordino, FC Lusitanos, UE Engordany and Atlètic d'Escaldes.

He made his international debut for Andorra in 2018.

References

1992 births
Living people
Andorran footballers
Andorra international footballers
FC Andorra players
CE Principat players
FC Santa Coloma players
FC Ordino players
FC Lusitanos players
UE Engordany players
Atlètic Club d'Escaldes players
Primera Divisió players
Association football forwards